Visa vid vindens ängar is the third studio album by the Belarusian-Norwegian artist Alexander Rybak, released on 15 June 2011 in Norway. It peaked at No. 7 on the Norwegian Albums Chart.

Singles
"Resan till dig" was the first single from the album released on 8 June 2011 as a digital download in Norway.

Track list

Charts

Release history

References

External links

Alexander Rybak albums
2011 albums